Issachar was, according to the Book of Genesis, a son of Jacob and Leah (the fifth son of Leah, and ninth son of Jacob), and the founder of the Israelite Tribe of Issachar.

Issachar may also refer to:

Tribe of Issachar 
Issachar (given name)
"Issachar", a song from The Mighty Mighty Bosstones' album Don't Know How to Party
Disc One: Issachar, of the double album The Circle Maker by John Zorn

See also